Alien Terminator may refer to:
 Alien Terminator (1988 film), an Italian film directed by Nello Rossati
 Alien Terminator (1995 film), an American horror film